Le Front latin was a French journal published from September 1935 to April 1940. It was co-edited by Fernand Sorlot and Philippe de Zara. The contributors openly supported Italian Fascism, and they called for closer relations between France and Italy, highlighting their shared Latin heritage.

References

1935 establishments in France
1940 disestablishments in France
Fascist newspapers and magazines
France–Italy relations